Jennifer Lyon Bell (born August 6, 1969 in Concord, Massachusetts) is an erotic film director/producer, curator, teacher, and writer. She is one of the early members of the feminist pornography movement and ethical porn movement, alongside Erika Lust, Shine Louise Houston, Tristan Taormino, and Maria Beatty. She is the founder and creative director of the independent production company Blue Artichoke Films in Amsterdam, the Netherlands.

She has honors degrees from Harvard University in Psychology, (B.A.)  and from the University of Amsterdam in Film + Television Studies (M.A.).

Films

Bell’s films have been cited for their sense of intimacy, realism, and authenticity.

Bell says she aims to create positive social change with her erotic films by purposely eroticizing sexual communication between partners, by diversifying portrayals of gender, and by showing diversity in both casting (diverse race, body type, etc.) and in showing the flexible, diverse, creative nature of sex.
 
Her films have been covered in Vice, BuzzFeed, Playboy, Filmmaker, Dazed, Cosmopolitan, and Huffington Post, among others.

References

External links 

 
 

1969 births
American pornographic film directors
American women film directors
Feminist pornography
Film directors from Massachusetts
Harvard College alumni
Living people
People from Concord, Massachusetts
Sex-positive feminists
21st-century American women